Dōng ( "East") is a Chinese surname. Its Vietnamese form is Đồng, Đông. It is listed 360th on the Hundred Family Surnames poem.

An origin of Dong is the simplification of the surname Dongfang, which originates from Fu Xi. During the middle Zhou Dynasty, Dongguan (東關) the Ji (姬) family reduce surname to Dong (東) in Jin (晉國). Donghu people (東胡) people get surname Dong (東) with tribe name.

See also
Dǒng or Tung, a surname
Dong

Chinese-language surnames
Individual Chinese surnames